Real People is an American reality television series that originally aired on NBC from 1979 to 1984, Wednesdays from 8 pm to 9pm Eastern Time. Its initial episodes aired live in the Eastern and Central time zones. Real People featured "real people" (as opposed to celebrities) with unique occupations or hobbies.

Synopsis
Real People featured a panel of seated hosts in front of a large studio audience. The hosts introduced pre-filmed segments and engaged in comedic banter about them. Each segment was a visit to someone with a unique occupation or hobby. Occasionally, someone was brought into the studio to interact with the audience.

In its early seasons, Real People was NBC's most popular series, often scoring at the top of the ratings, and was a rare hit for the network at a time when NBC was a distant third in the ratings and struggling with numerous flops. Segments included "funny pictures" and funny newspaper errors sent by viewers, who then were awarded a Real People T-shirt.

Regular hosts included John Barbour, Sarah Purcell, Byron Allen, Skip Stephenson, Bill Rafferty, Mark Russell, Peter Billingsley, David Ruprecht, and Fred Willard.

The success of Real People led to a batch of imitators, the best known and longest-running of which was That's Incredible! which aired on ABC, and That's My Line on CBS, hosted by Bob Barker. Real People gave fitness instructor Richard Simmons his major break into the mass media and spotlighted unique talents such as Pittsburgh Police traffic cop Vic Cianca.

When repeats of the show were initially syndicated by Telepictures to broadcast stations, they were edited down to 30-minute segments and retitled More Real People.

In 1980, NBC launched two attempts at spin-offs: Speak Up, America and Real Kids.  Speak Up, America starred former child televangelist Marjoe Gortner and basically expanded the opening segment of Real People (in which audience members were encouraged to sound off about any topics they wished) into a full hour program. Real Kids starred Peter Billingsley and a cast of child hosts in a format that mirrored Real People, but focused only on kids. Both spin-off formats quickly failed, though Billingsley went on to join Real People as a recurring host and contributor.

A one-hour retrospective special aired on October 1, 1991, with hosts Sarah Purcell and Fred Willard.

Ratings

In popular culture
The show was spoofed on Sesame Street with "Real Grouches", hosted by Oscar the Grouch who described his show as a program that "searches the world for interesting real-life grouches and brings them right into your living room."

A 1980 Saturday Night Live episode spoofed the show, alongside contemporary hit That's Incredible!, in a sketch called "Real Incredible People". Here, the hosts are astounded by mundane individuals such as a woman who reads before going to bed and a Japanese man who eats raw fish.

Doonesbury character Zonker Harris was featured on the show in his capacity as a professional tanner.

Mad Magazine parodied both Real People and That's Incredible! with "That's Real Incredible, People!"

References

External links

NBC original programming
1970s American reality television series
1980s American reality television series
1979 American television series debuts
1984 American television series endings
English-language television shows
Television series by Telepictures